Song of Dolores is a 1947 Spanish drama film directed by Benito Perojo, written by Francisco Madrid. It was entered into the 1947 Cannes Film Festival.

Cast
 Alfredo Alaria
 Imperio Argentina - Dolores
 Lola Beltrán
 Ricardo Canales - Mariano
 José Castro
 Manuel Díaz González
 Manolito Díaz - Lazaro
 Manuel Díaz
 Enrique Diosdado - Melchior
 Domingo Márquez
 Antonio Martínez
 Herminia Mas
 Andrés Mejuto
 Amadeo Novoa - Cirilo
 Lilian Valmar

References

External links

1947 films
1940s Spanish-language films
1947 drama films
Spanish black-and-white films
Films directed by Benito Perojo
Spanish drama films
1940s Spanish films